LCD is a liquid-crystal display, an electronic device.

LCD may also refer to:

Science and technology
 Lowest common denominator, a mathematical quantity
 Lacida, a cryptograph
 Lattice corneal dystrophy
 Liquor carbonis detergens, medical coal tar

Music
 LCD (music act), a performance group
 Loudest Common Denominator, an album by Drowning Pool

Other uses
 Lesotho Congress for Democracy, a political party
 Lord Chancellor's Department, an historical United Kingdom government department
 Low-carbohydrate diet, a food regimen
 Local coverage determination, as opposed to national coverage determination in medical insurance
 Lechang East railway station, China Railway pinyin code LCD
 Lori Chavez-DeRemer, member of the U.S. House of Representatives (as of January 3, 2023)

See also
 LCD Soundsystem, an American rock band